A wave is a nonverbal communication gesture that consists of the movement of the hand and/or entire arm that people commonly use to greet each other, but it can also be used to say goodbye, acknowledge another's presence, call for silence, or deny someone. The wave gesture is an essential element of human language.

History
The waving of the hand is a nonverbal gesture that has an unclear origin but is said to have dated back to as far as the 18th century however, it was not called waving and was not used as saying "hello", or "goodbye." The original gesture of waving was saluting. Prior to the 18th century, knights removed the guard of their helmets to show their identity, following with a salute to show they come in peace; saluting is also used to show others that they are not armed with weapons and do not pose a threat. The action of saluting was formalised only in the 1780s by European armies, since then, it has become a common way of properly addressing one another in the military setting. There is also an alternate ASL origin In the 1800s, waving handkerchiefs was a way to show approval or excitement or to call attention for the deaf, which is known as the "Chautauqua salute." It is recorded during a Canadian event in 1884 that multiple attendees forgot their handkerchief and so waved their hands in the air as a way to clap during the event. In modern days, the accepted and common way for a deaf individual to applaud is raising hands in the air and simultaneously shaking their open hand and moving their fingers back and forth.

Deaf
Sign language users also wave for "hello" and "goodbye." For an ASL user, saying "goodbye" is done by repeatedly opening and closing the right hand, and it faces the receiver of the gesture. This method is used to say "goodbye" to a group of people; saying "goodbye" to an individual is done with a different method. Saying "hello" is done by the traditional waving of the right hand. "Hello" is also communicated in ASL with an open palm salute starting at the forehead and moving down to the waist.  This method is used to say "hello" to a group of people, likewise with implying "goodbye", there is a different method to say "hello" to an individual.

Components
The waving of the hand has multiple variables and styles of performing the gesture. The common waving of the hand to mean "hello" or "goodbye" is done by moving the hand side to side, but there are more than one form of waving, each form having its own meaning.

Variables
Waving has four variables: the open palm (is the palm curved or straight), the angle of the wave (big waves or short waves), the elevation of the hand (above the head or held low), and the movement pattern of the wave (sideways rotation, up and down motion, side to side motion).

Variations
There are different ways to wave the hand; some include the standard side-to-side wave, palm wide wave, wiggly wave (finger wiggle wave), "flirtatious" wave, open-and close finger wave, arm wave, and the "Miss America" wave.

People wave by raising their hand and moving it from side to side. Another common wave is to raise one's hand and repeatedly move the fingers downward toward the palm. A variant known as the wiggly wave consists of holding the hand near shoulder level and wiggling the fingers randomly.  This can be used to appear cute or flirtatious to the target of the wave. The gesture can be used to attract attention at a distance. Most commonly, though, the gesture means quite simply "hello" or "goodbye.
The royal wave, also known as a regal wave, pageant wave, parade wave, or Miss America wave, is a similar but distinct kind of hand waving gesture in which a person executes something alternatively described as either a 'plastic grin' with 'fingers cupped' and 'forearm swaying side-to-side' or a "vertical hand with a slight twist from the wrist". The gesture is often performed, to various degrees, by different members of the British royal family, signaling anything from regality, class and control to elegance, restraint and character.

Cultural interpretations
In American culture, waving is a known gesture that means "hello" or "goodbye". That gesture can also be used to call the attention of someone, for example waving down a taxi, or waving at a friend from a great distance. That gesture could be interpreted differently and have a different meaning or even be highly offensive in South Korea, Nigeria, Greece, Bulgaria, Latin American countries, India, Japan, and other places.

African culture

Nigeria
In Nigeria, waving the hand with the palm facing outward in front of someone's face is highly offensive and should be avoided.

Asia

China
In China, women greet other women by waving.

Japan
In Japan, hand waving while the palm is kept outward and near the face is a gesture used to display confusion or that the individual waving does not know or understand.

South Korea
In South Korea, it is inappropriate to call the attention of someone with a palm-up arm wave. Instead, the proper way to wave to someone or call for attention is to wave vertically, making sure the palm of the hand is in a downward position. It is not uncommon to see waving among the younger population (in South Korea) to display their departure rather than bowing, which is the traditional way of greeting one another. Waving the hand outward towards the face is also used to grab the attention of a pet or child.

European culture
In Europe, there are two different common forms of waving: the palm-show and the palm-hide. The palm-show is dominant across most of Europe, but Italy predominantly uses the palm-hide wave.

Waving the hand to say "hello" or "goodbye" is done by moving the fingers down towards the wrist and back to an open palm position while keeping the palm facing out. Another way to say "goodbye" is done by wagging the fingers. That motion (wagging fingers) is also used to say "no."

Greece
In Greece, waving the hand with the palm facing out is an insult, rather than a greeting.

Holding the hand out, palm facing out and all five fingers exposed is offensive and dates back to the Byzantine times, when moutza would involve prisoners' faces being tainted with charcoal by their own hands and being forced to parade down town streets,  moutza. In American culture, holding the hand out like that can be used to call someone's attention or to greet someone.

Ireland
In Ireland, the deaf use the hand wave to greet one another. Deaf women use an "open palms up half moon shape" type of wave to greet one another. Men, however, use a different way of greeting one another or women.

Latin America
In Latin American countries, people greet one another by kissing, hugging or shaking hands. Waving their hand is uncommon, but it neither has any negative representation nor causes offense.

Nicaragua
In Nicaragua, waving to someone is tolerated but does not display proper etiquette. Instead, it is common to hug, kiss, or shake hands, following with the proper time of day ("good morning," "good afternoon," or "good evening").

See also
 Motorcycling greetings ("Biker wave")

References

Hand gestures